Idlib (also spelt Idleb or Edlib) is a city in northwestern Syria, and is the capital of the Idlib Governorate. The city was taken over by  Syrian revolution at the beginning of the Syrian Civil War in 2011, and by 2017 was the seat of the Syrian Salvation Government.

Demographics
In the 2004 census by the Central Bureau of Statistics, Idlib had a population of 98,791 and in 2010 the population was around 165,000. The inhabitants are mostly Sunni Muslims, although there was previously a significant Christian minority, but by 2022 there was only a single elderly Christian man left in the city. Idlib is divided into six main districts: Ashrafiyah (the most populous), Hittin, Hejaz, Downtown, Hurriyah, and al-Qusour.

History
In the tablets Duhulabuum is located 22 km south of "Unqi" which might correspond to the modern village of Kaukanya; a village located 22 km northeast of Idlib. Thutmose III also mentioned the city with the name Ytḥb.

Classical Antiquity

Idlib, along with the rest of Syria were conquered by the Armenian king Tigranes the Great, and incorporated in the Armenian Empire, only to be later conquered by the Roman Pompey the Great around 64 BC. The city was never of much significance, belonging to the province of Roman Syria under the Roman Empire, and later to the Eastern Roman province of Syria Secunda before being conquered by the Arabs around the middle of the seventh century. Not much remains from Roman and Byzantine times in the city, except in its museum. North of the city are the Dead Cities, a collection of important archaeological sites from the Byzantine era.

Ottoman era
During early Ottoman rule in Syria, beginning in 1516, Idlib was a small timar (fief). The village of Idlib was founded by Fazıl Ahmed Pasha, the son of Grand Vizier Köprülü Mehmed Pasha who appointed him governor of Damascus Eyalet. In later years, it developed as a town with markets, bathhouses and caravanserais, including Khan Abi Ali and Khan al-Ruz. 

From the Köprülü period, Idlib was a center of olive production. which in turn gave way to a prosperous olive-based soap industry. Although the major markets for Idlib's soap were at Aleppo, Antioch, and Hama, the product was exported as far as the Ottoman capital of Istanbul. Idlib was also a major producer of cotton fabrics. Western traveler Josias Leslie Porter noted that Idlib was "encompassed in olive groves, rare in this bleak region", and remarked that its olive groves were larger than those of Damascus, Beirut, or Gaza. In the mid-19th-century, the town had an estimated population of 8,000, including 500 Christians. In the late 19th century, Idlib was "flourishing" and still contained a number of Christian families, according to German orientalist Albert Socin.

Syrian civil war and HTS takeover 

During the uprising since 2011, Idlib was the focus of protests and fighting in the early phase of the Syrian war. As the uprising descended into armed conflict, Idlib became the focus of a rebel campaign, which temporarily captured the city and the governorate, prior to a government offensive in April 2012. After this, government forces retook the city and the rebel-controlled province after a month of fighting, prior to the attempted enforcement of the ceasefire proposed by Kofi Annan. After the 2015 Idlib offensive in March, the rebel alliance Army of Conquest, led by the al-Nusra Front and Ahrar al-Sham, succeeded in the Second Battle of Idlib and captured the city, as well as besieging the Shi'a-majority towns of Al-Fu'ah and Kafriya to the north of Idlib city. In April 2015, the interim seat of the Syrian opposition's Syrian Interim Government was proposed to be Idlib, in Idlib Governorate. On 23 July 2017, Tahrir al-Sham, the successor to the al-Nusra Front, expelled the remaining forces of Ahrar al-Sham from Idlib, capturing the entire city.

Climate
Köppen-Geiger climate classification system classifies its climate as hot-summer Mediterranean (Csa). Summers are hot and rainless, while winters are rainy and cool.

Economy

Idlib is a major production center for olives, cotton, wheat and fruits, particularly cherries. Other principal crops include almonds, sesame seeds, figs, grapes and tomatoes. In 1995 there were roughly 300 hectares planted with various citrus crop. Olive oil pressing and textiles are some of the city's local industries. The nearby city of Aleppo has an important economic presence in Idlib.

Idlib is a major agricultural center of Syria, the Idlib area is also historically significant, containing many "dead cities" and tells.

Because of the rapidly declining value of the Syrian pound, the Turkish lira became widespread in use in Idlib and was adopted as legal tender in the city on 15 June 2020.

Culture
The Idlib Regional Museum in the city contains over 17,000 of the Ebla tablets and serves as Idlib's main tourist attraction, excluding the nearby ancient site of Ebla itself. Under the Technical and Financial Cooperation Agreement between the governments of Italy and Syria, the museum was to undergo a restoration and renovation project starting in 2010.

Sports
Omayya SC, founded in 1972, is the most popular football team in the city. The club played in the Syrian Premier League for the 2011-2012 season. Idlib Municipal Stadium is the main football venue in the city.

Refugee and parathlete Dima Aktaa is from the city.

References

Bibliography

External links

News and events
eIdleb The first complete website for Idleb news and services

Governmental services
E.sy: The First Complete Governmental Online Services

 
Cities in Syria